Yan Feng is a paralympic athlete from China competing mainly in category F35 throwing events.

He competed in the 2004 Summer Paralympics in all three F35 throwing events winning a gold in the discus.

References

External links
 

Year of birth missing (living people)
Living people
Chinese male shot putters
Chinese male discus throwers
Chinese male javelin throwers
Paralympic athletes of China
Paralympic gold medalists for China
Paralympic medalists in athletics (track and field)
Athletes (track and field) at the 2004 Summer Paralympics
Medalists at the 2004 Summer Paralympics
21st-century Chinese people